Ging Ging is the debut studio album by Purr Machine, released on January 13, 2000, by Re-Constriction Records.

Reception

Steve Kurutz of Allmusic criticized Ging Ging for being "difficult album to listen to" that "create[s] a near impenetrable aural wall for listeners." Despite this, "he concluded that during the album's softer moments, "Regarding Mary" and "There's More" among them, the album does achieve moments of beauty." Aiding & Abetting praised Betsy Martin's performance and the band for drawing from a broad ranges of influences. Exclaim! critic Matt Mernagh gave it mixed review, saying "about the only thing Purr Machine won't do on their full-length debut is create a headache with their odd sounding goth electronica and fuzzy guitar."

Track listing

Personnel
Adapted from the Ging Ging liner notes.

Purr Machine
 Kirk Hellie – guitar
 Kevin Kipnis – bass guitar, guitar, programming, production, mixing
 Betsy Martin – lead vocals, acoustic guitar, loops, noises

Additional performers
 Kevin Choby (as Monkey Boy) – vocals (6)
 Michael Ciravolo – guitar (11)
 Kevin Pinnt – drum programming (7)

Production and design
 Susan Adams – photography
 Stan Gaz – illustrations
 Kevin M Robie – cover art, design
 Brad Vance – mastering

Release history

References

External links 
 
 Ging Ging at iTunes
 Ging Ging at Discogs (list of releases)

2000 debut albums
Purr Machine albums
Re-Constriction Records albums